Dancing Darkies is an 1896 American, short, black-and-white, silent documentary film shot by William K.L. Dickson.

External links 
 

1896 films
1890s American films
American black-and-white films
American short documentary films
American silent short films
Films directed by William Kennedy Dickson
1890s short documentary films
Black-and-white documentary films
Documentary films about African Americans
1890s dance films